Gateway Technical College is a public technical college in southeastern Wisconsin. It is one of the largest members of the state-run Wisconsin Technical College System, serving Kenosha, Racine, and Walworth counties.

With over 20,000 students, Gateway offers associate degrees in 47 fields, and 179 different diplomas and certifications. The college also offers certification and permit courses, as well as helping students attain GED and HSED diplomas. There are more than 37 standing credit transfer agreements with other colleges and universities, particularly UW–Parkside.

Gateway has three main campuses, in Elkhorn, Kenosha, and Racine, and six other educational centers located throughout the region.

History 
The Wisconsin continuation school program was established by Governor Francis McGovern in 1911. Later that year, the Racine Continuation School became the first to open under this program, and the first publicly funded technical school in America. In its earliest years, the school rented space in downtown Racine, as well as using the high school and Bull Elementary buildings for night school classes. The first class consisted of about 150 students. By 1916, the enrollment had expanded to over 1,000, the bulk of which were taking English and/or citizenship classes. Renamed the Racine Vocational School in 1917, expansion continued and over 3,000 students were enrolled in 1920. Racine's program was said to be a model for other technical schools throughout the state and country. The school purchased a site west of downtown at 800 Center Street in 1928, and the completed building, which brought all of the school's programs under one roof, opened in 1931. The school, later known as the Racine Technical Institute, opened satellite campuses in Burlington, Union Grove, and Waterford in 1967. The Racine Technical Institute building, at 800 Center Street, is now used as an annex to Racine's city hall.

The Kenosha Vocational School was founded in 1912, at the request of Kenosha superintendent Mary Bradford. A building was constructed for the school in 1914, and by 1920, with 914 students enrolled, that building had already been outgrown, requiring the school to share space with local factories. A larger building was constructed later that decade, which is now part of the Kenosha Medical Center. The Vocational Act of 1963 authorized the school to construct a new building near Bradford High School, the cornerstone of which was laid in 1965 by Governor Warren Knowles. In 1968, Walworth County was added to the Kenosha vocational district, and a satellite campus began construction in Elkhorn, although it was not complete until after the 1971 merger.

The Racine and Kenosha vocational schools were partners for much of their histories – both provided the same service to heavily industrial cities in southeastern Wisconsin, both were operated by the state of Wisconsin. Together, they became the first vocational schools to offer nursing courses in 1949, and both began offering two-year associate degrees in 1959. In 1971, the Wisconsin Technical College System merged these school systems together to form what was designated District 6. The newly formed system was named the Tri-County Technical Institute. It became Gateway Technical Institute the following year. The current name, Gateway Technical College, was given in 1987, as part of a statewide change. Since the 1990s, Gateway has continually expanded both its enrollment and facilities, and has placed a focus on smaller educational centers that are separate from the major campuses. Today, Gateway has over 25,000 students, 6,000 of whom attend school full-time.

Campuses

Elkhorn campus 
The Elkhorn Campus, which opened in 1971, is the primary Gateway facility in Walworth County. The campus consists of four buildings located southeast of Elkhorn, located near the interchange of I-43 and US 12. The North and South buildings make up most of the facility, containing classrooms, a library and bookstore, administration, and the student commons. The West Building houses the Walworth County Educational Consortium Alternative High School, a school created in 1990 by a partnership between Gateway and the five school districts in Walworth County, which serves high school students that are considered to be "at risk of not graduating". The school's veterinary science department is located in its own building.

Kenosha campus 
The Kenosha Campus was constructed before the Kenosha Technical Institute was part of Gateway. The Vocational Act of 1963 authorized the school to construct the current campus near Bradford High School, the cornerstone of which was laid in 1965 by Governor Warren Knowles. The core of the campus is a cluster of five buildings – the Academic Building, library, Service Building, Science Building, and Technical Building – all of which are connected by an enclosed walkway. The other buildings included in the Kenosha campus are the Pike Creek Horticultural Center and the Kenosha Conference Center, which houses the Madrigrano Auditorium. Two of Gateway's satellite educational centers are located near the Kenosha campus: the Center for Sustainable Living and the Inspire Center.

Racine campus 
Located along the lakefront south of downtown, Gateway's Racine Campus opened in 1972, on the former site of the University of Wisconsin–Racine. The Lincoln Building, named for the statue of Abraham Lincoln and Mary Todd Lincoln in neighboring East Park, is a three-story building with a cantilevered design that removes most of the indoor space on the first floor. The upper two floors feature classrooms and offices. The Lake Building is the campus' "key building for student access", featuring the S.C. Johnson Student Life Center, a common area named for the SC Johnson company, and the library, on the ground floor, with classrooms on the two upper floors. The five-story Technical Building is home to most of the school's labs, with mechanical engineering on the first floor, the IT Center of Excellence taking up all of the third floor, and the Barber/Cosmetologist program taking up most of the fifth. The Racine Building contains the school's administrative offices and conference rooms on its first floor, the Student Services Center on the third, with classrooms on the floor in between. All four of the Racine campus buildings are linked by a connecting hallway, most of which is underground.

Educational centers 
 The Burlington Center opened in Burlington in 2005. The single-story building, adjacent to Burlington High School, primarily offers general education courses. It is also home to the Adult Learning Center, which offers remedial education and helps students attain GEDs.
 The Inspire Center (formerly the Center for Bioscience & Information Technology), located next to the Kenosha campus, is an educational center that offers additional facilities for information technology, nursing, and other health-related courses. The building also houses a childcare center, the office of the college president, and Gateway's radio station WGTD.
 The Health and Emergency Response Occupations (HERO) Center, located next to the Burlington Center in Burlington, offers training for fire medic and EMS students. The facility offers realistic simulation of all stages of patient care.
 The Horizon Center for Transportation Technology in Kenosha offers specialized training for automotive technicians and aircraft pilots. The Horizon Center is run by Gateway through a partnership with Snap-on.
 The LakeView Advanced Technology Center, located in Pleasant Prairie, offers high school- and college-level courses to students at high schools in the Kenosha Unified School District. It shares a building with the LakeView Technology Academy, a specialized public high school. LakeView also offers technical courses in engineering, manufacturing, information technology, and biomedicine.
 The SC Johnson Integrated Manufacturing and Engineering Technology (iMET) Center is an educational center located in Sturtevant. iMET, in cooperation with SC Johnson, offers courses in engineering and manufacturing. The facility includes Tarnowski Hall, a flexible manufacturing laboratory, and a precision measurement equipment laboratory sponsored by the Starrett Company.

References

External links
Official website

Educational institutions established in 1972
Wisconsin technical colleges
Racine, Wisconsin
Education in Kenosha County, Wisconsin
Education in Walworth County, Wisconsin
Education in Racine County, Wisconsin
Education in Kenosha, Wisconsin
Buildings and structures in Kenosha, Wisconsin
Buildings and structures in Racine, Wisconsin